The Dallara F305 is an open-wheel formula racing car, designed, developed and built by Italian manufacturer Dallara, for Formula Three categories, in 2005. It became upgradable with aero kits, and its evolutions became known as the F306 and the F307, in 2006 and 2007, respectively.

References 

Dallara racing cars
Formula Three cars